The women's elimination race competition at the 2023 UEC European Track Championships was held on 9 February 2023.

Results

References

Women's elimination race
European Track Championships – Women's elimination race